Segye Ilbo is a Korean language newspaper. The newspaper is owned by News World Communications, which was established by the Unification Church. It is considered right-leaning.

References

External links
 Official website

Korean-language newspapers
Newspapers published in South Korea
Conservative media in South Korea
Discrimination against LGBT people in South Korea
Unification Church affiliated organizations